Daniele Morante (born 4 December 1979 in Rome, Italy) is an Italian footballer. He plays as a forward. He is currently playing for Italian team Fano.

Career
He started his career at S.S. Lazio and after finding it difficult to break into the first team Morante went out on loan to a number of clubs. He was released by Lazio in 2000 and he joined Treviso. He has since become a journey man playing for many clubs.
In January 2010 he joined Rimini.

In 2010 -11 season he returned to Lanciano  but only played in 2010–11 Coppa Italia Lega Pro.

References

External links

Italian footballers
Mantova 1911 players
Hellas Verona F.C. players
Living people
1979 births
S.S. Virtus Lanciano 1924 players
Vastese Calcio 1902 players
Association football forwards